Agriphila paleatellus is a species of moth in the family Crambidae described by Philipp Christoph Zeller in 1847. It is found in Croatia, Bosnia and Herzegovina, Greece, on Sicily and in Asia Minor and Syria.

References

Moths described in 1847
Crambini
Moths of Europe
Moths of Asia